DoubleDragon Corporation (formerly, Injap Land Corporation and DoubleDragon Properties Corporation) is a Philippine real estate development company based in Pasay City, Metro Manila, Philippines. It was founded in 2009 as a subsidiary of Injap Investments, Inc. In 2012, the company became a joint venture between Injap Investments, Inc. and Honeystar Holdings Corporation.

It is the parent company of CityMall, which planned to build 100 shopping malls by 2020.

The company went public in 2014. As of May 2017, it has a market cap of PHP 112.6 billion.

Subsidiaries
 CityMall Commercial Centers, Inc. 
 DoubleDragon Sales Corporation
 DoubleDragon Property Management Corporation
 DD Happyhomes Residential Centers, Inc.
 DD-Meridian Park Development Corporation
 Hotel of Asia, Inc.
Hotel 101
 Iloilo-Guimaras Ferry Terminal Corporation
 Piccadilly Circus Landing, Inc.

Gallery

References

External links

Real estate companies established in 2009
Companies of the Philippines
Shopping center management firms
Companies listed on the Philippine Stock Exchange
Companies based in Makati
Real estate companies of the Philippines
Philippine companies established in 2009